The second series of MasterChef New Zealand was filmed in September 2010 and started airing on 20 February 2011. It saw the induction of Josh Emett to the judging panel, replacing series 1 judge Ross Burden. Jax Hamilton and Nadia Lim competed in the grand finale, which was screened on 15 May 2011. It consisted of four challenges: a taste test, a pressure test, a mystery box challenge and an extreme dessert challenge, each worth a maximum of 20 points, except for the pressure test, which was worth a maximum of 40 points. Nadia became New Zealand's second MasterChef, beating Jax 88 points to 75.

Elimination table

 This Contestant Won The Competition.
 This Contestant Was The Runner-up.
 This Contestant Won The Elimination Challenge.
 This Contestant Was In the Winning Team.
 This Contestant Was In The Bottom Two.
 This Contestant Was Eliminated.

Contestants

References

Series 2
2011 New Zealand television seasons